Ray Greene may refer to:

 Ray Greene (politician) (1765–1849), United States senator from Rhode Island
 Ray Greene (American football) (1938–2022), American football coach
 Ray Greene (lacrosse) (1923–1987), American lacrosse player
 Raymond Greene (1901–1982), mountaineer
 Sir Raymond Greene, 2nd Baronet, British Conservative politician

See also
Ray Green (disambiguation)
Raymond Green (disambiguation)